Croasdale is a surname of English origin. It is a habitational name, named after an unidentified place, possibly Crowsdale Wood in North Yorkshire or Crossdale in Cumbria. The earliest record of the name occurs is of Johannes de Crosdale in 1379. Possible variations of the surname include: Croasdell, Croisdale, Crossdale, Croasdaile, Crosdill, Croisdall, Crosdil, Crosedale, Crowsdale, Croysdill, Crossdil, Crousdale, Croasdoll, Croosdale, Croysdale, Crosdale, Crossdell, and Crosdall.

References

Surnames
English toponymic surnames